The  is a professional wrestling championship in Japanese promotion Pro Wrestling Noah. It was created on October 3, 2019 and inaugurated on November 2 when Takashi Sugiura defeated Michael Elgin. The title is scheduled to be defended exclusively in Japan. Instead of being another "heavyweight" championship, Noah categorizes the title as an openweight title, with both heavyweight and junior heavyweight wrestlers being eligible to challenge for it. , there have been a total of 9 reigns shared between 7 different champions.  The current champion is El Hijo del Dr. Wagner Jr. who is in his first reign.

History
In January 2019, LIDET Entertainment took over the ownership of Noah and on October 3, Riki Choshu announced on behalf of LIDET Entertainment, the creation of the GHC National Championship, with the inaugural champion being crowned on November 2, 2019, at Noah the Best 2019, in a match between Michael Elgin and Takashi Sugiura. It was later announced that the title would be an openweight title, with both heavyweight and junior heavyweight wrestlers being eligible to challenge for it. The title was scheduled to be defended exclusively in Japan and was part of a plan by LIDET Entertainment to attract a new audience. On November 2, 2019, Sugiura went on to defeat Elgin to become the inaugural GHC National Champion, before losing the title to Katsuhiko Nakajima on May 9, 2020.

Reigns

Combined reigns 

{| class="wikitable sortable" style="text-align: center"
!Rank
!Wrestler
!No. ofreigns
!Combineddefenses
!Combineddays
|-
!1
|  || 2 || 6 || 371
|-
!2
| Kenoh || 2 || 9 || 299
|-
!3
| Masakatsu Funaki || 1 || 6 || 292
|-
!4
|style="background-color:#FFE6BD"| El Hijo del Dr. Wagner Jr. † || 1 || 2 || +
|-
!5
| Katsuhiko Nakajima || 1 || 2 || 87
|-
!6
| Kazuyuki Fujita || 1 || 0 || 39
|-
!7
| Masaaki Mochizuki || 1 || 0 || 16
|-

Belt design
The standard Championship belt has three≤ plates on a red leather strap.

See also
GHC Heavyweight Championship
GHC Junior Heavyweight Championship
GHC Tag Team Championship
GHC Junior Heavyweight Tag Team Championship
GHC Hardcore Tag Team Championship

References

External links
Global Honored Crown official page
GHC National Championship on Wrestling-Titles.com

Pro Wrestling Noah championships
National professional wrestling championships
Openweight wrestling championships